Platinum is an album by the jazz fusion band The Headhunters that was released in 2011. The album combines jazz and hip hop.

Track listing
"Platinum Intro" (:50) 
"Mission Statement" (4:01)
"Reality of It" (:17)
"Salamander" (7:09)
"I Predict a Good year" (:11)
"D-Funk (Funk With Us)" (4:48)
"I Feel Really Good About" (:10)
"Tracie" (6:01)      
"Rehearse Everybody" (:13)
"Paging Mr. Wesley" (5:31)  
"M Trane" (8:48)
"Apple Tree" (5:18)
"Palm Nut" (6:53)
"Years of Touring" (:10)
"Congo Place" (4:55)
"On the Road" (:16) 
"Head Hunting" (4:48)
"Skizness" (3:50) 
"Soul Glow" (5:29)
"Platinum Outro" (:42)

Personnel
 Rob Dixon – soprano, alto, and tenor saxophones, keyboards
 Azar Lawrence – soprano saxophone
 Bennie Maupin – soprano and tenor saxophones
 Donald Harrison – alto saxophone, Moog bass, keyboards
 Derrick Gardner – trumpet
 PJ Yinger – trumpet
 Kyle Roussel – keyboards
 Patrice Rushen – keyboards
 Gary Mielke – keyboards, bass, Moog bass
 Richie Goods – bass
 Jerry Stucker – guitar
 Mike Clark – drums
 Bill Summers – percussion, vocals
 George Clinton – vocals
 Cynthia Layne – vocals
 Alexei Marti – timbales, vocals
 Snoop Dogg – rap
 Jaecyn Bayne – rap
 Private Pile – rap
 Killah Priest – rap

References

2011 albums
The Headhunters albums